Amen is the second album by the American band Amen and its first for a major label, released on September 21, 1999, by I Am/Roadrunner Records. The first track on the album, "Coma America", became the band's first single. In 2001, the album was re-released with four new bonus tracks.

Amen was recorded by Casey Chaos on vocals, Shannon Larkin on drums, Sonny Mayo and Paul Fig on guitar and John Fahnestock a.k.a. Tumor on bass guitar. The album was produced by Ross Robinson who had worked with Casey Chaos and helped him to sign to Roadrunner Records. It was released by Robinson's imprint label, I Am. The album sold around 15,000 copies in its first year.

Releases
In 2001, the album was re-released by Roadrunner Records and included the four unreleased songs from the single of "Coma America". At this point, Amen had already switched to Virgin Records.

In 2007, Metal Mind Productions re-released the album in a new digipack edition on gold disc, digitally remastered using 24-Bit process, with a limited run of 2,000 hand-numbered copies.

In both cases, the band was not involved with the releases.

Track listing
All songs written by Casey Chaos.

Credits

Personnel
Casey Chaos - vocals; cover, design concept, packaging concept
Sonny Mayo - guitar
Paul Fig - guitar
Tumor (John Fahnestock) - bass guitar
Shannon Larkin - drums

Production
Ross Robinson - producer, A&R 
Chuck Johnson - engineer, mixing on "Coma America"
Rob Agnello - engineer
George Marino - mastering
Steve Evetts - mixing (tracks: 3, 5 to 18) 
Joe Barresi - mixing (tracks 2 and 4)

References

Amen (American band) albums
1999 albums
Albums produced by Ross Robinson
Roadrunner Records albums